Dorothy Smith (16 November 1919 – 2005) was a British gymnast. She competed in the women's artistic team all-around at the 1948 Summer Olympics.

References

1919 births
2005 deaths
British female artistic gymnasts
Olympic gymnasts of Great Britain
Gymnasts at the 1948 Summer Olympics